The Ambassador Extraordinary and Plenipotentiary of the Russian Federation to the Republic of India is the official representative of the President and the Government of the Russian Federation to the President and the Government of India.

The ambassador and his staff work at large in the Embassy of Russia in New Delhi. There are consulates-general in Kolkata, Chennai and Mumbai.

History of diplomatic relations

Diplomatic relations between the Soviet Union and the Dominion of India were formally established with the opening of embassies on 13 April 1947. The first ambassador, was appointed on 23 October 1947, and presented his credentials on 1 January 1948. With the dissolution of the Soviet Union in 1991, the Soviet ambassador, continued as representative of the Russian Federation until 1996.

List of representatives (1947 – present)

Representatives of the Soviet Union to the Dominion of India (1947 – 1950)

Representatives of the Soviet Union to the Republic of India (1950 – 1991)

Representatives of the Russian Federation to the Republic of India (1991 – present)

See also
 Foreign relations of India
 Ambassadors of Russia

References

 
India
Russia